"Two Weeks" is a song by the American indie rock band Grizzly Bear, and the first single from the band's third studio album, Veckatimest. Featuring backing vocals from Victoria Legrand, singer and organist for the dream pop duo Beach House, it was released as a single on June 1, 2009. The track met its debut live performance on the Late Show with David Letterman in July 2008.

Music video
The video for "Two Weeks" was directed by Patrick Daughters. It features the band members sitting on an altar at an empty church, singing along to the song as slowly their heads and faces start to glow, then sparks fly from their heads and ultimately their heads catch fire as the video ends. When interviewed by Amanda Petrusich, band singer Ed Droste explained:

Reception
Upon its release, "Two Weeks" was acclaimed by music critics, and many regarded it as a highlight of Veckatimest. Pitchfork Media ranked the song at No. 162 in their "Top 500 Tracks of the 2000s" list. It was voted at No. 61 on Triple J's Hottest 100 for 2009. Stereogum cited it as the sixth best song of the group.

"Two Weeks" has gained popularity in YouTube, where its video clip (uploaded by the verified channel of the original group) has over 14 million views. Das Racist references the song in the track "Free Jazzmatazz." They claim about their own song, "this is the best song ever. Better than 'Juicy'... better than "Two Weeks" by Grizzly Bear. That's a pretty good song, right?"

The song was featured in the 2012 movie The Dictator, an episode of the television series How I Met Your Mother, and a Volkswagen commercial aired during Super Bowl XLIV.

Track listing

References

External links
 Single synopsis at Warp Records

2009 singles
Grizzly Bear (band) songs
2009 songs
Warp (record label) singles